The 1901 Kentucky Derby was the 27th running of the Kentucky Derby. The race took place on April 29, 1901.

Full results

 Winning breeder: Overton H. Chenault (KY)

Payout
 The winner received a purse of $4,850.
 Second place received $700.
 Third place received $300.

References

1901
Kentucky Derby
Derby
April 1901 sports events
1901 in American sports